"Deuces Are Wild" is a song performed by American band Aerosmith. It was written by lead singer Steven Tyler and professional songwriter Jim Vallance. It was originally considered for inclusion on the Pump album in 1989.

The song eventually surfaced as a track on the compilation album The Beavis and Butt-Head Experience in late 1993, and was released as a promotional single in early 1994. The single was successful on rock radio, topping the U.S. Billboard Mainstream Rock Tracks chart for four weeks in the spring of 1994 and reaching #25 in Canada.

Vallance wrote the music for the song in 1988 and recorded a demo in his home studio. The demo was sent to the band on a cassette that included other potential Aerosmith songs, including "The Other Side". According to Vallance, Geffen A&R rep John Kalodner liked the music and Tyler's lyrics, but did not like the song's title.  Vallance and Tyler refused to change it, and Kalodner responded by nixing the song from Pump. Vallance noted that he believed that the released version was simply his home demo with overdubs by Tyler, Joe Perry, and Joey Kramer, rather than being a complete Aerosmith recording.

Music video
A music video was created for the song, featuring random clips of the band, and released on the Big Ones companion video release Big Ones You Can Look At.

Charts

References

Aerosmith songs
1989 songs
1994 singles
Songs written by Jim Vallance
Songs written by Steven Tyler
Geffen Records singles
Song recordings produced by Bruce Fairbairn
Glam metal ballads